The Fredericktown Ferry (nicknamed Fred) is a cable driven ferry that operated on the Monongahela River in southwestern Pennsylvania about 30 miles south of Pittsburgh from 1948 until May, 2013. The ferry consisted of a 60-foot steel boat that could hold up to 6 vehicles at a time. It connected the village of Fredericktown in Washington County with the village of La Belle in Fayette County which are separated by the  width of the river. In 2013, the ferry cost $2 per motor vehicle and $0.50 per pedestrian, and was subsidized by Washington and Fayette Counties.

The ferry service was discontinued due to low ridership and mounting financial deficits in 2013.

See also
List of crossings of the Monongahela River

References

External links
 Fredericktown Ferry website

2013 disestablishments in Pennsylvania
Crossings of the Monongahela River
Ferries of Pennsylvania
Transportation in Fayette County, Pennsylvania
Transportation in Washington County, Pennsylvania
Cable ferries in the United States
1948 establishments in Pennsylvania